Parsabad-Moghan Airport is an airport in Parsabad, Iran .

Airlines and destinations

References

Airports in Iran
Buildings and structures in Ardabil Province
Transportation in Ardabil Province